The Florence Institute of Design International in an international school of Italian design. The institute was founded in 2008 in Florence Italy. Admission to the school is open to students from any country. All classes are held in the English language. Programs that are currently offered include Interior Design, Graphic Design, Art History, and Architecture.

References
 https://www.independent.co.uk/student/gap-year/gap-year-ultimate-listings-guide-890748.html 
 https://web.archive.org/web/20110711010752/http://www.florence-institute.com/cim08.pdf
 https://web.archive.org/web/20081011095316/http://www.tradelinkmedia.com.sg/construction.html
 http://www.idfxmagazine.com 
 http://www.youthedesigner.com/2008/05/22/italys-newest-boutique-school-of-design
 http://www.florence-institute.com 

Design schools in Italy
Schools in Florence
Universities and colleges in Florence
Educational institutions established in 2008
2008 establishments in Italy